Arizonan may refer to:

An Arizonan, something of or pertaining to the U.S. state of Arizona
Arizonan, an adjective describing someone or something that is from or related to Arizona
USS Arizonan (ID-4542A), a United States Navy cargo ship and troop transport in commission from 1918 to 1919